Niklas Lindbäck (born 2 March 1974) is a Swedish equestrian, He competed at the 2012 Summer Olympics in individual and team eventing, finishing seventeenth and fourth respectively.

References

1974 births
Living people
Swedish male equestrians
Olympic equestrians of Sweden
Equestrians at the 2012 Summer Olympics